Jože Vrtačič (born 1 February 1980) is a Slovenian sprinter. He competed in the men's 4 × 400 metres relay at the 2000 Summer Olympics.

References

1980 births
Living people
Athletes (track and field) at the 2000 Summer Olympics
Slovenian male sprinters
Olympic athletes of Slovenia
Place of birth missing (living people)